Avelina Landín Rodríguez (10 November 1919 – 21 February 1991) was a Mexican singer, considered "one of the great and distinctive voices of Mexican bolero music".

She was born in Mexico City to Irineo Landín Jauregui and Magdalena Rodríguez Moreno. She was the elder sister of singer María Luisa Landín, with whom she formed the duets Pirita y Jade and Hermanas Landín in the 1930s. Together they recorded several singles and were very successful on radio, especially on the XEQ station. Avelina retired from singing when she married Ángel Zempoaltecatl Ortega, and María Luisa began her solo career. When she resumed her career years later, Avelina, as a soloist, had a very important place on the XEW station and recorded her hits for the RCA Víctor label.

Landín died of cardiac arrest in Mexico City and was interred at Mausoleos del Ángel.

Discography

Singles
 "Quiéreme, pero quiéreme" (1949)
 "¿Por qué has cambiado?" (1949)
 "¿Por qué te vas?" (1949)
 "Una mirada nada más" (1949)
 "Que me castigue Dios" (1949)
 "No te desesperes" (1949)
 "Culpable" (1949)
 "Todos somos así" (1949)
 "Amor de mi vida" (1949)
 "Buenas noches, mi amor" (1949)
 "Equivocadamente" (1950)
 "Estamos en paz" (1950)

Studio albums
 La voz que canta al corazón (Orfeón, 1968)
 Nostalgia (Caleidofon, 1976)

Compilation albums
 Recordando "La voz cálida" de Avelina Landín (RCA Camden)
 Colección bolero: Avelina Landín (Orfeón)
 Boleros inolvidables (Musart)

References

External links
 

1919 births
1991 deaths
Bolero singers
Singers from Mexico City
RCA Victor artists
Musart Records artists
20th-century Mexican women singers